Richard Smith (born 10 October 1972) is a South African cricketer. He played in six first-class matches for Boland from 1994/95 to 1995/96.

See also
 List of Boland representative cricketers

References

External links
 

1972 births
Living people
South African cricketers
Boland cricketers
Cricketers from Bellville, South Africa